The Inflation Reduction Act of 2022 (IRA) is a landmark United States federal law which aims to curb inflation by reducing the deficit, lowering prescription drug prices, and investing into domestic energy production while promoting clean energy. It was passed by the 117th United States Congress and signed into law by President Joe Biden on August 16, 2022. It is a budget reconciliation bill sponsored by Senators Chuck Schumer (D-NY) and Joe Manchin (D-WV). The bill was the result of negotiations on the proposed Build Back Better Act, which was reduced and comprehensively reworked from its initial proposal after being opposed by Manchin. It was introduced as an amendment to the Build Back Better Act and the legislative text was substituted.

The law, as passed, will raise $738billion and authorize $391billion in spending on energy and climate change, $238billion in deficit reduction, three years of Affordable Care Act subsidies, prescription drug reform to lower prices, and tax reform. The law represents the largest investment into addressing climate change in United States history. It also includes a large expansion and modernization effort for the Internal Revenue Service (IRS). According to several independent analyses, the law is projected to reduce 2030 U.S. greenhouse gas emissions to 40% below 2005 levels. The projected impact of the bill on inflation is disputed. However, the law is expected to reduce out of pocket costs for Medicare part D consumers. Furthermore, income tax credits and rebates aim to make many energy efficient consumer technologies more affordable.

Background 

The Build Back Better Plan was a legislative framework proposed by United States President Joe Biden between 2020 and 2021. Generally viewed as ambitious in size and scope, it sought to make the largest nationwide public investments in social, infrastructural, and environmental programs since the 1930s Great Depression-fighting policies of the New Deal.

The plan was divided into three parts: one of them, the American Rescue Plan, a COVID-19 relief spending bill, was signed into law in March 2021. The other two parts were reworked into different bills over the course of extensive negotiations within and among Congressional entities. The American Jobs Plan (AJP) was a proposal to address long-neglected infrastructure needs and reduce America's contributions to climate change's destructive effects; the American Families Plan (AFP) was a proposal  to fund a variety of social policy initiatives, some of which (e.g. paid family leave) had never before been enacted nationally in the U.S.

The Build Back Better Act was a bill introduced in the 117th Congress to fulfill aspects of the Build Back Better Plan. It was spun off from the American Jobs Plan, alongside the Infrastructure Investment and Jobs Act, as a $3.5trillion Democratic reconciliation package that included provisions related to climate change in the United States and social policy. Following negotiations, the price was lowered to approximately $2.2trillion. The bill was passed 220–213 by the House of Representatives on November 19, 2021.

In December 2021, amidst negotiations and parliamentary procedures, Senator Joe Manchin publicly pulled his support from the bill citing its cost and a too-aggressive transition to clean energy, then retracted support for his own compromise legislation. This effectively killed the bill as it needed 50 senators to pass via reconciliation, and all 50 Republican senators opposed it.

In the summer of 2022, Manchin and Senate Majority Leader Chuck Schumer engaged in negotiations over a revised reconciliation bill with about $1 trillion of revenue from tax reform, $500 billion in climate and health care spending, and $500 billion in deficit reduction. However, Manchin announced abruptly on July 14, 2022 that he wouldn't support new climate spending or tax reform due to his fear that the bill would worsen inflation. He later stated that he would be open to revisiting those elements a few months later, provided that inflation slowed meaningfully. Biden nonetheless conceded defeat on a climate bill, urging Congress to pass whatever Manchin would agree to (a slim, $280 billion health care bill that would acquire its revenue from allowing Medicare to negotiate prices and spend $40 billion on Affordable Care Act subsidies).

Unbeknownst to nearly everyone in Washington, Manchin and Schumer reengaged in secret negotiations on July 18, 2022. On July 27, hours after the Senate passed the CHIPS and Science Act, the two men released a statement announcing the $738 billion Inflation Reduction Act of 2022, which included climate spending and tax reform.

The sudden deal was widely regarded as a 'shocker' as Democrats had voiced that there was little hope for a revival of their climate and tax priorities in addition to Manchin himself being rather pessimistic on the prospect of an expanded bill in public.

As the revised bill made its way through the chambers of Congress, the new reality of Biden unexpectedly having a clear path to enacting substantial portions of his domestic agenda into law led to a wide reevaluation of the success of the Biden presidency thus far and was expected to give the President and his party a boost in the 2022 midterm elections.

Legislative history

The Build Back Better Act, which passed the House on September 27, 2021, was used by the Senate as the legislative vehicle for this legislation. On August 6, 2022 Senate Majority Leader Chuck Schumer proposed an amendment which would replace the text of the previously passed bill with the text of the Inflation Reduction Act of 2022. This substitute amendment was later adopted.

On August 7, 2022, following the vote-a-rama, an unlimited marathon voting session on amendments, that lasted nearly 16 hours, the Senate passed the bill (as amended) on a 51–50 vote, with all Democrats voting in favor, all Republicans opposed, and Vice President Kamala Harris breaking the tie. On August 12, 2022, the bill was passed by the House on a 220–207 vote, with all Democrats voting in favor and all Republicans voting against it. On August 16, 2022, the bill was signed into law by President Joe Biden.

Provisions
Over a period of 10 years, the law is estimated to raise revenue from:
 Prescription drug price reform to lower prices, including Medicare negotiation of drug prices for certain drugs (starting at 10 new ones per year by 2026, increasing to more than 20 additional ones per year by 2029) and rebates from drug makers who price gouge – $281billion
 Imposing a selective 15% corporate minimum tax rate for companies with higher than $1billion of annual financial statement income – $222billion
 Increased tax enforcement – $181billion
 Imposing a 1% excise tax on stock buybacks – $74billion
 2-year extension of the limitation on excess business losses - $53 billion

In the same time period, it would spend this revenue on:
 Addressing domestic energy security and climate change, including funding for drought resiliency in western states – $391billion
 Deficit reduction – $238 billion
 Continuing for three more years the expansion of Affordable Care Act subsidies originally expanded under the American Rescue Plan Act of 2021 – $64billion
 Increased funding for the IRS for modernization and increased tax enforcement – $80billion

$270 billion of the law's climate action investments are embedded in the federal tax code. As part of the overall $158 billion investment into clean energy, the law extended the solar investment tax credit for 10 years and invests $30 billion in nuclear power. It also invests $13 billion in electric vehicle incentives, $14 billion in home energy efficiency upgrades, $22 billion in home energy supply improvements, and $37 billion in advanced manufacturing. $20 billion goes to investments in climate-smart agriculture, more than $5 billion goes to revising remediation programs for those affected by discriminatory USDA lending practices, $5 billion goes to forest protection and urban heat island reductions, and nearly $3 billion goes to coastal habitat protection.

The law contains provisions that cap insulin costs at $35/month and will cap out-of-pocket drug costs at $2,000 for people on Medicare, among other provisions.

Several provisions in the initial deal between Schumer and Manchin were changed after negotiations with Senator Sinema: a provision narrowing the carried interest loophole was dropped, a 1% excise tax on stock buybacks was added, manufacturing exceptions were added to the corporate minimum tax, and funding for drought relief for western states was added.

Impact

Economic 
The nonpartisan Congressional Budget Office (CBO) estimated that the bill would have no statistically significant effect on inflation. The Penn Wharton Budget Model also estimated that the bill would have no statistically significant effect on inflation, but would reduce cumulative deficits by $264 billion.

The nonpartisan Committee for a Responsible Federal Budget analyzed the bill and concluded that the "deficit reduction, along with other elements of the bill, is likely to reduce inflationary pressures and thus reduce the risk of a possible recession." It further estimates that the bill would reduce the federal deficit by $1.9trillion over a 20-year period. This figure includes the resulting savings on interest payments.

The World Economic Forum, a Swiss business lobbying non-profit, states “…in the medium to long-term, the impact of the IRA is likely to be deflationary” and cites a prediction by the University of Massachusetts that the law will generate 912,000 jobs per year.

The Tax Foundation, a fiscally conservative think tank, stated that the bill "may actually worsen inflation by constraining the productive capacity of the economy." It estimated the bill would result in a loss of 29,000 full-time equivalent jobs and a 0.2% reduction in GDP, while resulting in $324billion of additional revenues, which would go towards deficit reduction.

Modeling by the Energy Innovation group, a nonpartisan energy and climate think tank, estimated that this bill would lead to the creation of 1.4 million to 1.5 million additional jobs and increase the GDP 0.84–0.88% by 2030.

Research from climate policy analyst Jack Conness has revealed that $56 billion worth of 65 climate-friendly tech manufacturing investments within the United States has been announced by companies since the passage of the Inflation Reduction Act, creating 50,900 projected jobs . However, citing Conness' research, Reuters noted that $43.5 billion of these investments will be in right-to-work law states that allow laborers to not join a labor union in a represented workplace, in contrast to Biden's messaging supporting the labor movement.

The climate think tank Rocky Mountain Institute estimates that if businesses and consumers take sufficient advantage of the Act's provisions to meet national climate goals, Texas would see investments of $131 billion creating 116,000 jobs, California would see $117 billion creating 140,000 jobs, Florida $62 billion creating 85,000 jobs and Illinois $38 billion creating 42,000 jobs. The same analysis notes that the states seeing the four largest per capita investments from the Act, ranging between roughly $7,000 and $12,000, would be Wyoming, North Dakota, West Virginia, and Louisiana, all Republican-leaning states.

Energy and climate change 
The Inflation Reduction Act is the largest piece of federal legislation ever to address climate change. According to the CBO, it will invest $391 billion in provisions relating to energy security and climate change. This includes $270 billion in tax incentives, and $27 billion for a green bank created by amending the Clean Air Act. In contrast, a report by Credit Suisse projects that the total climate spending in the bill would be significantly higher, at $800 billion. The summary provided by Senate Democrats identifies primary goals as driving down consumer energy costs, increasing energy security, and reducing greenhouse gas emissions.

The largest allocation areas are: $128 billion for renewable energy and grid energy storage, $30 billion for nuclear power, $13 billion for electric vehicle incentives, $14 billion for home energy efficiency upgrades, $22 billion for home energy supply improvements, and $37 billion for advanced manufacturing. An assortment of additional measures includes $32 billion for investments in rural economies, racial justice in farming, forestlands and coastal habitats, $3 billion in tax incentives for installing carbon capture and storage at existing power plants, $3 billion to electrify the USPS fleet, $3 billion to reconnect neighborhoods harmed by infrastructure potentially via freeway removal, investments in sustainable aviation fuel, grants for high voltage electric power transmission and decarbonization of port equipment, garbage trucks, school buses and local government fleets, purchases of rural electric cooperative debt alongside other assistance to cooperatives, and requirements that the government reduce embedded emissions in its procurement process.

The bill aims to decrease residential energy costs by focusing on improvements to home energy efficiency. Measures include $9 billion in home energy rebate programs that focus on improving access to energy efficient technologies, and 10 years of consumer tax credits for the use of heat pumps, rooftop solar, and high-efficiency electric heating, ventilation, air conditioning and water heating. The bill extends the $7,500 tax credit for the purchase of new electric vehicles while also providing a $4,000 tax credit toward the purchase of used electric vehicles, in an effort to increase low- and middle-income access to this technology. This is projected to lead to an average of $500 in savings on energy spending for every family that receives the maximal benefit of these incentives. The bill includes a 30% tax credit ($1,200 to $2,000 per year) and different types of rebates (reaching $14,000) for homeowners who will increase the energy efficiency of their house. In some cases, all upgrade expenses will be returned.

The bill allocates $3 billion for helping disadvantaged communities with transportation matters, including reconnecting communities separated by transport infrastructure, assuring safe and affordable transportation "and community engagement activities." This should improve transit-oriented development. Projects improving connectivity and walkability in these neighborhoods can get grants reaching 80%-100% of the overall cost. The bill also supports biking.

There are also funds allocated to national clean energy production. This includes the continuation of the production tax credit ($30 billion) and investment tax credit ($10 billion) toward clean energy manufacturing, including solar power, wind power, and grid energy storage. Some $14 billion of the clean energy package will go to rural areas, and include building biofuel infrastructure.

The bill also provides funds toward the decarbonization of the economy in other areas, providing various tax credits and grants and loans toward decarbonizing the industrial and transportation sectors. One $27 billion decarbonization grant program is a green bank to capitalize smaller regional green banks, established by amending the Clean Air Act, which is expected to generate high rates of return for the government on private sector investments. The grant package also includes a program to reduce methane emissions from production and transportation of natural gas. The bill also provides for a focus on communities and environmental justice by providing several grants targeting historically marginalized and disadvantaged communities that have been disproportionally impacted by environmental pollution and climate change.

The bill also allocates funds for rural communities, racial and economic justice in farming, marine ecosystems and forestland, including $20 billion to invest in climate-smart agriculture, $5 billion to invest in forest conservation and urban tree planting, $3.1 billion to help farmers with high-risk operations caused by USDA-backed loans, $2.6 billion to protect and restore coastal habitats, and $2.2 billion to redress proven claims from farmers of discrimination by the USDA's lending programs.

The bill should cut the global greenhouse gas emissions by a level similar to "eliminating the annual planet-warming pollution of France and Germany combined" and may help to limit the warming of the planet to 1.5 degrees Celsius - the target of the Paris Agreement. With the bill and additional federal and state measures, the USA can fulfill its pledge in the Paris Agreement: 50% greenhouse gas emissions reductions by the year 2030.

An assessment by the Rhodium Group, an independent research firm, estimated it would reduce national greenhouse gas emissions 32–42% below 2005 levels by 2030, compared to 24–35% under current policy while reducing household energy costs and improving energy security. Furthermore, Rhodium Group projects that the nuclear provisions in the bill are likely to "keep much, if not all" of the nation's nuclear reactors that are at risk of retiring, estimated to be 22–38% of the fleet, online through the 2030s.

A preliminary analysis by the REPEAT Project of Princeton University estimated that the investments made by the law would reduce net emissions 42% below 2005 levels, compared to 27% under current policies (including the Infrastructure Investment and Jobs Act).

The Energy Innovation group estimated the reduction of greenhouse gas emissions at 37–41% below 2005 levels in 2030, compared to 24% without the bill. This estimate of the greenhouse gas emission reduction lines up with the figure provided by the bill's authors which is a 40% reduction in carbon emissions relative to 2005 levels.

Modeling from the nonpartisan research institution Resources for the Future indicates the bill would decrease retail power costs by 5.2–6.7% over a ten-year period, resulting in savings of $170–220 per year for the average U.S. household. The modeling also predicts that the bill would tend to stabilize electricity prices. The Act would help foster a tripling in the size of the American solar power industry and provide unprecedented investment security, according to the trade group Solar Energy Industries Association. The trade group American Clean Power's assessment of business announcements of IRA-linked investments in renewables and battery plants, during the period between the Act's signing and November 30, 2022, yielded a figure of over $40 billion creating 6,850 jobs. 80 percent of these investments are in Republican-held districts.

In reaction to the Supreme Court case West Virginia v. EPA, which limited the EPA's authority to institute a program such as the Obama-era Clean Power Plan, the IRA also includes language granting the EPA more authority to regulate carbon dioxide and other greenhouse gases, as well as to promote renewable energy.

Taxes and distributional impact 

Excerpts from the nonpartisan Joint Committee on Taxation (JCT) indicated that the legislation might lead to increased payments on personal taxes for Americans of all incomes (an increase in $16.7billion for taxpayers earning less than $200,000 a year, $14.1billion for taxpayers earning between $200,000 and $500,000, and $23.5billion for taxpayers earning over $500,000). This calculation was based on the assumption that companies would indirectly pass on parts of the minimum corporate tax to employees, an assumption that was criticized by Steven M. Rosenthal, a senior fellow at the nonpartisan Tax Policy Center (TPC). Economist William G. Gale, who is also co-director of the TPC, comments that it is important to consider that the calculations by the JCT did not take into account the provisions in the bill that would extend premium tax credits for health plans for low- and middle-income taxpayers, provide households with tax credits for making their property more energy-efficient, and lower the price of prescription drugs.

The Tax Policy Center estimated that the bottom 80% tax filers by income would receive a net benefit, if ACA premium tax credits (subsidies) are included. The 80th-99th percentile would incur a small cost (0-0.1% increase in average federal tax rate) while the top 1% would incur a 0.2% increase. The costs mainly are imposed indirectly as corporations facing higher taxes may reduce the wage increases or levels for workers; individual tax rates were not changed.

Treasury Secretary Janet Yellen directed IRS Commissioner Charles Rettig to not use the new funding allocated in the bill to increase the rate of audits of those making less than $400,000 a year above historical levels, but to instead focus on "high-end noncompliance."

The Treasury and Internal Revenue Service published guidance on eligibility for electric vehicle owners to claim tax credits worth between $3,500 - $7,500, including outlining a requirement for the vehicle to have a final assembly in North America. The Department of Energy and the Department of Transportation also published resources identifying vehicles that will likely meet all requirements for tax credit. The Department of Energy indicated that their list of eligible vehicles is not a guarantee for credit, and states that the Vehicle Identification Number (VIN) will give full manufacturing details and locations. Those qualified will receive the tax credits, known as the Clean Vehicle Credit, previously called the Qualified Plug-In Electric Drive Motor Vehicle Credit. The US Treasury Department has also stated that owners who purchase eligible vehicles previous to August 16, 2022 but did not possess the vehicle until after that date, also qualify for the Clean Vehicle Credit. However, because of the requirement that qualified EVs must have "at least 40 percent of materials sourced from North America or a US trading partner by 2024" and the batteries cannot contain minerals that "were extracted, processed, or recycled by a foreign entity of concern", most currently available EVs on the market will not qualify for the tax credits.

Additional tax credits were presented in the bill for energy efficiency in buildings, expanding current incentives in a tier-based system beginning in 2023. The bill specifies that commercial buildings must update efficiency by 25%, compared to a reference building, to qualify for $0.50 per square foot of tax credit for the first tier, increasing to a maximum of $5.00 per square foot for the final tier. The tax credits also extends to single and multi-family housing, requiring 50% less annual energy consumption compared to similar units.  Vincent Barnes, a senior vice president from Alliance to Save Energy in Washington, D.C, stated that these policies were meant to reduce energy costs and demand on the power grid.

Reactions 
Senator Joe Manchin (D-WV) issued a statement for his support of the bill. President Joe Biden also stated his support for the proposed bill. On August 4, Senator Kyrsten Sinema (D-AZ) issued a statement indicating that she would support the bill after striking a deal with fellow Democrats to change several tax provisions.

Congressional Republicans have voiced unanimous opposition to the bill, claiming the legislation would do little to combat inflation, or would exacerbate it. Senate Minority Leader Mitch McConnell (R-KY) denounced the legislation as "reckless spending" and Ranking Member of the Senate Budget Committee Lindsey Graham (R-SC) called it "insanity".

In a letter sent to congressional leadership and touted by Senate Democrats, 126 economists including Robert Rubin, Jack Lew, Jason Furman, Lawrence Summers, Mark Zandi, and Joseph Stiglitz, wrote that the bill is more than fully paid for, lowers prices for consumers and will lower inflation.

In a letter sent to House and Senate leadership first reported by Fox News but not made publicly available, 230 economists wrote that "the legislation will actually contribute to inflation" and "will add to price rises." The economists include Larry Kudlow of Fox News, "Nobel laureate Vernon Smith, former chairman of the Council of Economic Advisers Kevin Hassett, former director of the Office of Management and Budget Jim Miller, and Robert Heller, president of the Federal Reserve Board from 1986 to 1989. In addition, professors from the University of Chicago, Princeton University, Duke University, the University of Virginia, Columbia University and the University of Notre Dame signed the letter."

Tom Philpott, an agriculture journalist writing in Wired, praised the bill's investments in climate-smart agriculture and remedies for USDA loan discrimination, but heavily criticized Sinema's deletion of the carried interest loophole modification and the lack of provisions to expand funding for the National School Lunch Act and improvements to child nutrition (as expressed in the original Build Back Better Act) and for soil erosion prevention programs (which enhance small-scale carbon farming and encourage a shift away from monoculture-dependent farming for ethanol fuel in the United States).

Public organizations 
Darren Woods, the CEO of oil and gas energy giant ExxonMobil, called the bill "a step in the right direction" and endorsed its provisions related to oil and gas. Multiple coal industry groups, including the West Virginia Coal Association, criticized the bill for "[obviating] any need to innovate coal assets" and doing "nothing for coal or coal generation".

Many mainstream environmental organizations supported the bill, such as the Nature Conservancy, the National Wildlife Federation, and American Forests. The director of North America policy for the Nature Conservancy, Tom Cors, called the legislation "historic", while Aviva Glaser of the NWF called the infusion of spending "transformative." The Natural Resources Defense Council argued that despite continued acceptance of fossil fuels in the IRA, its climate mitigation policies would outweigh their impact ten times over. Health and environmental justice organizations like Earthjustice have welcomed the law.

However, not all environmental groups expressed unqualified support. Some environmentalists noted that the bill contained more "carrots", or incentives for positive behavior, than "sticks", or new regulations. Several groups argued that as the legislation did not seek to eliminate fossil fuels entirely, it was inadequate to meet the threat of climate change. Jean Su, the energy justice program director at the Center for Biological Diversity, called the legislation "a backdoor take-it-or-leave-it deal between a coal baron and Democratic leaders in which any opposition from lawmakers or frontline communities was quashed." The Climate Justice Alliance criticized the IRA, saying that "the strengths of the IRA are outweighed by the bill's weaknesses and threats posed by the expansion of fossil fuels and unproven technologies such as carbon capture and hydrogen generation."

The heads of the National Cooperative Business Association, National Rural Electric Cooperative Association, National Farmers Union, and National Council of Farming Cooperatives praised the IRA for its provisions assisting cooperatives in energy and agriculture, particularly direct grants and debt forgiveness. Cornelius Blanding, head of the U.S. Federation of Southern Cooperatives, also praised the IRA, but expressed concern that its revisions of the American Rescue Plan's debt relief programs for minority farmers would worsen racial discrimination in agriculture.

Cycling organizations criticized the IRA for removing the incentives for electric bicycles in the original Build Back Better Act, having a better energy-per-incentive ratio and reaching a wider demographic, than for electric cars remaining in the IRA. Sean Jeans-Gail, Vice President of Government Affairs and Policy at the Rail Passengers Association, criticized the IRA saying,"It's a bitter pill in terms of rail and transit, which is the one clearly established, low-carbon emission transportation systems we have going". He also criticized the bill for being car centric.

27 European Union finance ministers have expressed "serious concerns" about the financial incentives of the Inflation Reduction Act, and are considering challenging it. They have listed at least nine points in the legislation, which they say could be in breach of World Trade Organization rules. They were opposed to the subsidies for consumers to buy North American-assembled electric cars, as EU officials believe the subsidies discriminate against European carmakers. One EU official told CNBC that, “there is a political consensus (among the 27 ministers) that this plan threatens the European industry” and its supply of raw materials. In February 2023, the European Commission announced it would propose the "Net Zero Industrial Act", similar to the IRA, in turn putting pressure on the United Kingdom and South Korea.

On March 10, 2023, President Biden and President of the European Commission Ursula von der Leyen announced they would be initiating top-level talks to mitigate issues of subsidy competition.

Representatives from South Korea have also voiced similar concerns to Europe, given that the legislation can also restrict Hyundai's and other South Korean carmakers' business in the American market.

Some members of the trade union United Auto Workers, including former vice president Cindy Estrada, have obliquely commented to The American Prospect that the Inflation Reduction Act's implementation regarding prevailing wage requirements and collective bargaining rights (particularly at electric vehicle factories owned by startup companies) may be weakened, and if not properly implemented, the Act could be linked to poor hiring practices and working conditions. Other labor union representatives, from the AFL–CIO, Southwest Laborers District Council, Ironworkers Local 848 and United Steelworkers, told Reuters in March 2023 that investments announced due to the Act have not improved labor unions' ability to organize particularly in right-to-work law states, but that they were hopeful in pushing ahead. The Prospects editor, Robert Kuttner, commented in January 2023 that the Treasury Department's interpretation of the Act regarding electric vehicle leasing could also potentially undermine the Act's U.S. domestic supply provisions in favor of European or Chinese suppliers.

See also
List of acts of the 117th United States Congress
Energy in the United States
Energy policy of the United States, including the Infrastructure Investment and Jobs Act and CHIPS and Science Act
List of tie-breaking votes cast by the vice president of the United States
2021–2023 inflation surge

References

External links
 Inflation Reduction Act of 2022 (PDF) as enacted in the US Statutes at Large
 H.R.5376 - Inflation Reduction Act of 2022 bill information on Congress.gov

Climate change law
Climate change policy in the United States
Presidency of Joe Biden
United States legislation
Acts of the 117th United States Congress
United States federal energy legislation
United States federal health legislation
United States federal reconciliation legislation